The Governor of Kherson Oblast is the head of executive branch for the Kherson Oblast in Ukraine.

The office of Governor is an appointed position, with officeholders being appointed by the President of Ukraine, on recommendation from the Prime Minister of Ukraine, to serve a four-year term.

The official residence for the Governor is located in Kherson.

Governors

Chairman of Executive Committee of Kherson Oblast
 Pylyp Pasenchenko-Demydenko (1944–1950)
 Tymofiy Barylnyk (1950–1963) 
 Mykola Makushenko (1963–1969)         
 Mykola Kobak (1963–1964)
 Dina Protsenko (1969–1978)
 Vasyl Metlyayev (1978–1983)
 Mykhailo Kushnerenko (1983–1987)
 Oleksandr Melnykov (1987–1991)
 Mykhailo Kushnerenko (1991–1992)

Representative of the President
 Oleksandr Melnykov (1992–1994)

Chairman of the Executive Committee
 Vitalii Zholobov (1994–1995)

Heads of the Administration
 Vitalii Zholobov (1995–1996)
 Yurii Karasyk (1996–1997)
 Mykhailo Kushnerenko (1997–1998)
 Anatoliy Kasyanenko (1998–1999)
 Oleksandr Verbytsky (1999–2001)
 Yuriy Kravchenko (2001–2002)
 Anatolii Yurchenko (2002–2004)
 Serhii Dovgan (2004)
 Volodymyr Khodakovsky (2004–2005)
 Borys Silenkov (2005–2010)
 Anatolii Hrytsenko (2010)
 Mykola Kostyak (2010–2014)
 Yuriy Odarchenko (2014)
 Ihor Shepelyev (2014) (acting)
 Andriy Putilov (2014–2016)
 Andrii Gordieiev (2016–2019)
 Dmytro Butriy (2019) (acting)
 Yuriy Husev (2019–2020)
 Serhiy Kozyr (2020–2021) (acting)
Hennadiy Lahuta (2021-2022)
Dmytro Butriy (2022) (acting)
Yaroslav Yanushevych (2022–2023)
 Oleksandr Prokudin (2023–present)

Notes

References

Sources
 World Statesmen.org

External links
Government of Kherson Oblast in Ukrainian

 
Kherson Oblast